Niels B. Christiansen (born 12 April 1966, in Sønderborg) is a Danish businessman who is the current chief executive officer of The Lego Group.

Christiansen was managing director and chief executive officer of Danfoss from October 2008 to July 2017, when he was succeeded by Kim Fausing. In August 2017, Lego announced that Christiansen would take over as chief executive officer in October.

Education
As a student from Aabenraa State School, Christiansen graduated as a civil engineer from the Technical University of Denmark in 1991. He completed an MBA from INSEAD in 1993.

Career
Christiansen was a Management Consultant at McKinsey from 1991 to 1995 and Vice President of Corporate Development at the Hilti Corporation from 1995 to 1997, before being employed by GN netcom. From 2000 to 2003, he was the managing director and chief executive officer of GN Netcom, and from 2003 to 2004, as the Group Executive Vice President of GN Store Nord.

In 2004, Christiansen joined Danfoss, holding positions at the company such as COO (2005-2006), deputy managing director (2006-2008), and managing director and chief executive officer (2008-2017).

On October 1, 2017, he became the managing director and chief executive officer of the Lego Group.

Board posts
Christiansen is chairman of the Board of William Demant Holding A/S and Axcel. He is also a Member of the board of directors at AP Møller-Maersk, as well as at the Technical University of Denmark.

References

Danish business executives
1966 births
People from Sønderborg Municipality
Living people
Danish chief executives